Xiao Di (born May 14, 1991 in Binzhou) is a Chinese Greco-Roman wrestler. He competed in the men's Greco-Roman 98 kg event at the 2016 Summer Olympics, in which he was eliminated in the repechage by Ghasem Rezaei.

In 2019, he competed in the men's Greco-Roman 97 kg event at the 2019 World Wrestling Championships held in Nur-Sultan, Kazakhstan.

References

External links
 

1991 births
Living people
Chinese male sport wrestlers
Olympic wrestlers of China
Wrestlers at the 2016 Summer Olympics
Asian Games silver medalists for China
Wrestlers at the 2014 Asian Games
Asian Games medalists in wrestling
Medalists at the 2014 Asian Games
Wrestlers at the 2018 Asian Games
Medalists at the 2018 Asian Games
21st-century Chinese people